Premonitions is the debut studio album of American musician Miya Folick. In September 2018, the single "Stop Talking" was released and supporting music video. The album was released on October 26, 2018.

Critical reception

Premonitions was released to critical acclaim, with music critics praising Folick's vocal ability and the songwriting. On Metacritic, the album has an average rating of 84/100, indicating "universal acclaim".

Margaret Farrell, writing for Pitchfork, praised Folick's singing, calling her voice, "deep and broad and rich, yet capable of soaring to fluttering soprano heights."

Track listing

References

2018 debut albums
Albums produced by Justin Raisen
Terrible Records albums